The Best Of... Atreyu is the first compilation album by American metalcore band Atreyu. It is band's final release on Victory Records, after being signed to Hollywood Records in 2006. The collection takes songs from the band's first 3 albums. It was released on January 23, 2007. It is a CD/DVD combo. It also comes with a Victory records sample CD.

Track listing 

 On some copies of this CD, the song "Untitled Finale" is replaced by "Our Sick Story (Thus Far)" and "Shameful" is replaced by "Untitled Finale".

DVD 
 "Ain't Love Grand" – music video
 "Lip Gloss & Black" – music video
 "Right Side of the Bed" – music video
 "The Crimson" – music video
 "Ex's & Oh's" – music video
 "The Theft" – music video
There is also bonus content on the DVD featuring music videos from other artists on Victory Records.

Charts

References 

Atreyu (band) albums
Albums produced by Josh Abraham
Albums produced by Garth Richardson
2007 greatest hits albums
2007 video albums
Music video compilation albums
Victory Records compilation albums
Victory Records video albums